RideShare Delaware is DART First State's program to reduce traffic and encourage alternative transportation arrangements.  The program is supported by state and federal funds as a part of Delaware's efforts to maintain air quality. RideShare works in partnership with local and regional agencies towards meeting Federal Air Quality Standards. It helps form both carpools and vanpools. It also offers special programs for students and Delaware employers.

History
RideShare Delaware was established in 1997 by the Delaware Department of Transportation. Beginning in 2005, RideShare Delaware participates in a joint cross-promotion with Delaware E-ZPass to encourage commuters to both carpool as well as use E-ZPass transponders to reduce the lines at toll plazas. In 2007, Parsons Brinckerhoff, a transportation consulting firm, was hired to administer the program. It is now managed by URS Corporation.

Commuter programs

Real-time RideMatching 

Since its founding RideShare Delaware has provided a forum to match people with similar commuting patterns in order to form car pools. Since March 2011, RideShare Delaware has offered an interactive commute tracking database to identify potential carpool partners. Its website pairs up carpool partners, logs and tracks clean commutes, and provides transit information.

The RideMatching system provides emission tracking software to calculate and report carbon dioxide emission as well as mileage, fuel and cost reduction for carpoolers, transit riders, vanpoolers, bicyclists and people who walk to work. This information shows commuters how their clean commute reduces the cost of their trip to the office, and also quantify how they are positively impacting the region's air quality by sharing the ride.

In April 2009, RideShare Delaware's enrollment reached 15,000 commuters.

Guaranteed Ride Home program 
All registered commuters in the RideShare Delaware database(regardless of whether they ride transit, carpool, vanpool, walk or bike) are eligible for the Guaranteed Ride Home (GRH) program. If an emergency arises on a day that a commuter shares the ride to work that prevents the commuter from taking his normal ride home, RideShare Delaware will reimburse the commuter for any necessary taxi or rental car services. This free benefit is limited to five uses per calendar year per registered user.

School Pool 
The School Pool program is a free, voluntary program that assists parents by identifying other parents who want to share in the duties of driving their children to and from school.  It serves individuals who travel to Delaware schools, even if the user lives in Pennsylvania, Maryland, or New Jersey.

Vanpool Assistance 
Delaware RideShare facilitates vanpool commuting. Vanpools serve preformed groups of 7 to 15 passengers. Delaware RideShare identifies potential vanpool participants who share a commuter pattern. If they form a vanpool, the cost of the vanpool will be determined by the number of commuters in the van, distance traveled and total gas costs. Commuters using a vanpool could benefit from employer-offered transit benefits. Offered as an employer subsidy, pre-tax option or combination, employees are entitled to up to $230 a month towards the cost of riding the train, bus or vanpool if offered by their employer. As a result of the Base Realignment and Closure Commission process, approximately 8,000 new employees are being reassigned to the Aberdeen Proving Ground, and Delaware RideShare assists employees relocating to or living in Delaware with establishing a vanpool commute to Aberdeen.

Delaware RideShare encourages State of Delaware employees to participate in the Fleet Link State Vanpool program. State employees who vanpool are eligible for emergency ride home trips only through the State Vanpool program. Any group of four or more Delaware employees can start a vanpool by renting a state-owned van for a flat monthly fee that includes gas, tolls and periodic maintenance.

Bicycle commuting
Delaware RideShare promotes bicycle commuting by producing maps of bicycle commuting route. DART First State also offers bicycle racks on the front of many of its buses for commuters who do not want to bike the entire length of a commute.  In addition, bicycle commuters are also eligible for the GRH program.

Employer services 

RideShare Delaware provides services to employers in Delaware including consultations, employee surveys, employer referrals, marketing and outreach, density maps, worksite events,  online ridematching, vanpool formation and support, relocation assistance, and commute incentives. Delaware RideShare helps implement the credit against Delaware corporate income taxes that are available for employers offering approved carpooling plans.

References

Carsharing
Road transportation in Delaware